Nikita Vladimirovich Surkov (born 11 August 1987) is a Russian professional football player. He plays for FC Sakhalinets Moscow.

Career
At 6 years old, Surkov was accepted to "Spartak" football school, where he studied from 1993 to 2002. In 2007, he was invited to the training camp in FC Gazovik Orenburg, then signed a one-year contract with the club. A year later, the contract was extended for another few seasons.

In 2009, he joined football team second division zone "West" - FC Nara-ShBFR Naro-Fominsk. In 2010 he signed with FC Dynamo Saint Petersburg in the Russian Football National League, which became FC Petrotrest Saint Petersburg in 2011 and then reverted to Dynamo Saint Petersburg a few years later.

In 2014, Surkov joined FC Sokol Saratov.

Awards

Individual
Best defender of Russia, zone West D-2 (2011/2012)

External links
 

1987 births
Footballers from Saint Petersburg
Living people
Russian footballers
Association football defenders
Association football midfielders
FC Petrotrest players
FC Dynamo Saint Petersburg players
FC Sokol Saratov players
FC Sakhalin Yuzhno-Sakhalinsk players
FC Orenburg players
FC Neftekhimik Nizhnekamsk players